Christmas Valley Airport  is located 1 m (2 km) southeast of Christmas Valley, Oregon, United States.

The airport consists of a 60' (18m) wide runway with a segmented circle marked by white tires and a medium-intensity runway lighting system which allows 25 minutes for landing once an aircraft is on beam and activates the system. Pilot activates the Runway Edge Lights: RY 7/25 - Common Traffic Advisory Frequency (CTAF). Tie-downs are available but at this time there are no fuel or oxygen services onsite. Two single engine aircraft are based on the field. The airstrip is unattended and open for public use.

History
Established in 1962, the airport was intended to promote land development. The runway was built as part of the original development of the town and dedicated in 1985. A recent $500,000 grant from the Federal Aviation Administration widened, paved, and lit the mile-long airstrip.

References

External links

 Airport Layout Plan

Airports in Lake County, Oregon
1962 establishments in Oregon